Haziganj or Hajiganj is an upazila of Chandpur District in the Division of Chittagong, Bangladesh.

Geography
Hajiganj subdistrict (Chandpur district) area 189.90 km2, located in between 23°12' and 23°20' north latitudes and in between 90°45' and 90°55' east longitudes. It is bounded by kachua and matlab dakshin upazilas on the north, faridganj and ramganj upazilas on the south, shahrasti upazila on the east, chandpur sadar, Matlab Dakshin and Chandpur Sadar upazilas on the west.

Demographics
The Hajigonj Municipality is a 1st class municipality. The population of the municipality is 58,000, with a population density of 3055 people per km2.
According to the 2011 Bangladesh census, Haziganj had a population of 291,057. Males constituted 49.17% of the population, and females 50.83%. The population aged 18 or over was 127,498. Haziganj had an average literacy rate of 60.5% (7+ years), compared to the national average of 64.4%.

Economy 

Hats, bazars and fairs Hats and bazars are 28, fairs :Hajiganj, Bakila Bazar, Rampur, Rajargaon, Ramchandrapur, Chengatali and Aliganj, Barkul, Belghar-Rajapur, Balakhal fairs are notable.

Main exports Jute, Jute made products.

Cold stores: 2
Rice mills: 19
CNG filling stations: 3
petrol pumps: 2

Administration
Haziganj Upazila is divided into Haziganj Municipality and 12 union parishads: Bakila (Dakshin Rajargaon), Dakshin Gandharbapur, Dakshin Kalocho, Hajiganj, Hatila Paschim, Hatila Purba, Paschim Barkur, Purba Barkur, Uttar Gandharabpur, Uttar Kalocho, Uttar Rajgaon and Daddoshgram Union. The union parishads are subdivided into 120 mauzas and 149 villages.

Haziganj Municipality is subdivided into 12 wards and 18 mahallas.

Infrastructure 
upozila health complex, hajigonj
govt. Union Hosp.-8
Private Hosp-9
Eye Hosp.-1
Diabetic Hosp-1
Clinic-49

Religious Center
Great Mosque of Hajiganj A Historical Mosque At Chandpur. The first choice of many leisure travelers is the various archeological and ancient traditional installations. Haziganj Bara Masjid is a significant sight for these people. Hajiganj Bara Masjid is located in the middle of Hajiganj Bazar in Chandpur district upazila. Hajiganj is one of the largest mosques in the subcontinent.

See also
Upazilas of Bangladesh
Districts of Bangladesh
Divisions of Bangladesh

References

Upazilas of Chandpur District